The 1960 Louisville Cardinals football team was an American football team that represented the University of Louisville as an independent during the 1960 NCAA College Division football season. In their 15th season under head coach Frank Camp, the Cardinals compiled a 7–2 record.

The team's statistical leaders included Ernie Green with 441 rushing yards and John Giles with 436 passing yards.

Schedule

References

Louisville
Louisville Cardinals football seasons
Louisville Cardinals football